Athboy railway station was the terminus of a branch line which diverged from the Dublin to Navan line at Kilmessan Junction and served the village of Athboy in County Meath, Ireland.

History
Opened by the Dublin and Meath Railway,  the station was absorbed by the Midland Great Western Railway, and so joined the Great Southern Railways.

The station was then nationalised, passing on to the Córas Iompair Éireann as a result of the Transport Act 1944 which took effect from 1 January 1945. It then closed under this management.

References 

Disused railway stations in County Meath
Railway stations opened in 1864
Railway stations closed in 1947
1864 establishments in Ireland
1947 disestablishments in Ireland
Railway stations in the Republic of Ireland opened in the 19th century